Catherine Barnett (born 1960 in San Francisco) is an American poet and educator. She is the author of Human Hours (Graywolf Press, 2018); The Game of Boxes (Graywolf Press, 2012), winner of the James Laughlin Award; and Into Perfect Spheres Such Holes Are Pierced (Alice James Books, 2004), winner of the Beatrice Hawley Award. Her honors include a Whiting Award and a Guggenheim Fellowship. She has published widely in journals and magazines including The American Poetry Review, Barrow Street, The Iowa Review, The Kenyon Review, The Massachusetts Review, The New York Review of Books, The New Yorker, Pleiades, Poetry, the Virginia Quarterly Review, and The Washington Post. Her poetry was featured in The Best American Poetry 2016, edited by Edward Hirsch. Barnett teaches in the graduate and undergraduate writing programs at New York University and is a distinguished lecturer at Hunter College. She has also taught at Princeton University, The New School, and Barnard College, where she is a Visiting Poet. She also works as an independent editor. She received her B.A. from Princeton University and an M.F.A. from the Warren Wilson College MFA Program for Writers.


Honors and awards
 2012 James Laughlin Award
 2006 Guggenheim Fellowship
 2004 Whiting Award
 2004 Glasgow Prize for Emerging Writers
 2003 Beatrice Hawley Award

Published works
 Into Perfect Spheres Such Holes are Pierced (Alice James Books, 2004)
 The Game of Boxes (Graywolf Press, 2012)
 Human Hours (Graywolf Press, 2018)

References

Sources
 New York University > Creative Writing Program > Faculty
 The New School > Riggio Honors Program: Writing and Democracy > Faculty

External links
 Graywolf Press
 Alice James Books
Profile at The Whiting Foundation
 The Washington Post > A Poet's Choice By Edward Hisrch > Catherine Barnett > May 9, 2004
 Glasgow Prize Article
 Audio: Catherine Barnett Reading for Fishousepoems.org
 Poetry Foundation > Catherine Barnett > Family Reunion

American women poets
New York University faculty
Princeton University alumni
Living people
Poets from California
Poets from New York (state)
1960 births
Warren Wilson College alumni
21st-century American poets
21st-century American women writers
American women academics